Sir Trevor Steven Pears CMG (born 18 June 1964) is a British businessman. He is the executive chairman of the Pears Foundation, the family foundation he set up in 1992 with his two brothers, Mark and David.

Early life
Trevor Pears was born to a Jewish family, the son of Clive Pears and Clarice Talisman Castle (1933–1999), and the grandson of Bernard Pears. Clarice Talisman Castle was born and raised in Lochside Street, Shawlands, Glasgow, the daughter of Abraham Castle, a dealer in electrical and wireless appliances, and his wife Hannah.

He was educated at the private City of London School for Boys, followed by City Polytechnic, where he studied law.

Career
He inherited, along with his brothers Mark and David, a multi-billion pound property empire, the William Pears Group, founded by his father and grandfather.  Pears remains a director. 

Pears also oversees the strategic direction of the Pears Foundation, which is concerned with positive identity and citizenship and seeks to build respect and understanding between people of different backgrounds and faiths; investing in programmes in the UK, Israel and the developing world. The Foundation has also partnered with the British Council, British Embassy in Israel, and UJIA to fund research into treating diabetes, heart disease, leukaemia, anaemia and Alzheimer’s.

Activism
In 2005, he donated £20,000 to David Cameron's Conservative Party leadership campaign. He is the chair of the Antisemitism Policy Trust.

Personal life
He lives in Hampstead, London, with his wife Daniela and their three children. In 2014, Daniela Pears was appointed as mayoress of the London Borough of Camden. She is also a trustee of the Jewish charity Mitzvah Day.

Honours
Pears is a fellow of Birkbeck, University of London and was appointed Companion of the Order of St Michael and St George (CMG) in the 2011 New Year Honours for services to the community and UK/Israel relations. He was knighted in the 2017 Birthday Honours for services to philanthropy.

References

External links
Pears Foundation
Antisemitism Policy Trust

British businesspeople
British Jews
Living people
1964 births
Companions of the Order of St Michael and St George
Conservative Party (UK) donors
Pears family